Swimming at the 2009 Southeast Asian Games was held in Vientiane, Laos from 10 to 14 December 2009. In this edition, the sport consisted of 32 events, swum in a long course (50m) pool.

Results

Men's events

Women's events

Medal standings

References

 
2009 in swimming
Aquatics at the 2009 Southeast Asian Games
2009